Nikita Sergeevich Scherbak (born December 30, 1995) is a Russian professional ice hockey player who is currently playing for HC Slovan Bratislava of the Slovak Extraliga.

He most recently played under contract with the Texas Stars of the American Hockey League (AHL). Scherbak was selected by the Montreal Canadiens in the first round (26th overall) of the 2014 NHL Entry Draft.

Playing career

Junior

Scherbak began his junior career in 2012 playing with Kapitan Stupino in the Russian Junior Hockey League. Scherbak was drafted by the Saskatoon Blades in the 2nd round of the 2013 CHL Import Draft.

He joined the Blades in 2013 where he led all rookies in goals (28), assists (50), and points (78) during the 2013–14 WHL season. His outstanding play was rewarded when he was invited to play the 2014 CHL Top Prospects Game.

Scherbak was rated as a top prospect who was viewed as a possible first round selection heading into the 2014 NHL Entry Draft. After his selection on July 22, 2014, he was  signed to a three-year entry-level contract with the Canadiens.

On September 22, Scherbak was traded to the Everett Silvertips from the Saskatoon Blades based on league rules which state that no more than two non-North American players may be on the same club's roster at any given time.

Professional
During the 2016–17 season, Scherbak made his NHL debut for Montreal Canadiens on January 7, 2017 against Toronto Maple Leafs and scored on the power play, on his first NHL career shot, to put the Canadiens up 3–2, with just 0.9 seconds left of the first period. Montreal won the game 5–3.

After starting the first 11 games of the 2018–19 season as a healthy scratch, Scherbak was assigned to the Laval Rocket, Montreal's AHL affiliate, for conditioning. He made his season debut on October 31, 2018 in a 2–1 loss against the Belleville Senators. On November 9, 2018, Scherbak scored his first goal of the 2018–19 season in a 5–1 victory over the Cleveland Monsters. He was recalled from the conditioning stint on November 14, 2018, but did not immediately rejoin the Canadiens because of a lower-body injury. On December 1, 2018, Scherbak was placed on NHL waivers by the Canadiens. He was subsequently claimed by the Los Angeles Kings.

On June 25, 2019, having completed his contract with the Kings, Scherbak was not tendered a qualifying offer by the club, releasing him as a free agent. The following day, while opting to return to Russia to continue his career, Scherbak was officially signed to a three-year contract with Avangard Omsk of the KHL. In his first KHL season in 2019–20, Scherbak opened with just 2 goals and 6 points through 16 games before he was released by Avangard Omsk. On November 5, 2019, Scherbak continued in the KHL, joining fellow club Traktor Chelyabinsk for the remainder of the season.

As an un-signed free agent entering the pandemic delayed 2020–21, Scherbak opted to return to North America, agreeing to a one-year AHL contract with the Texas Stars, affiliate of the Dallas Stars, on 23 January 2021. He was productive during his tenure with Texas, collecting 5 goal and 15 points through 28 appearances in the shortened season.

As a free agent in the off-season, Scherbak returned to Europe in securing a contract with Slovak Extraliga club, HC '05 Banská Bystrica, on 9 September 2021.

Career statistics

Awards and honours

References

External links

1995 births
Living people
Avangard Omsk players
Everett Silvertips players
Kapitan Stupino players
Laval Rocket players
Los Angeles Kings players
HC '05 Banská Bystrica players
Montreal Canadiens draft picks
Montreal Canadiens players
Ice hockey people from Moscow
National Hockey League first-round draft picks
Ontario Reign (AHL) players
Russian ice hockey right wingers
St. John's IceCaps players
Saskatoon Blades players
Texas Stars players
Traktor Chelyabinsk players
Stadion Hradec Králové players
HC Slovan Bratislava players
Russian expatriate sportspeople in Canada
Russian expatriate sportspeople in Slovakia
Russian expatriate sportspeople in the United States
Russian expatriate sportspeople in the Czech Republic
Russian expatriate ice hockey people
Expatriate ice hockey players in Slovakia
Expatriate ice hockey players in the United States
Expatriate ice hockey players in Canada
Expatriate ice hockey players in the Czech Republic